Yevgeni Alexandrovich Pakhomov (1880–1965) was a Russian, Georgian and Azerbaijani numismatist and archaeologist and a recognized authority in the numismatics of the Caucasus.

Biography 
Born in Stavropol, he graduated from the Tiflis Realschule in 1896, the St. Petersburg Archeological Institute in 1900, and the St. Petersburg Technological Institute in 1902. In 1920, he helped to organize the Museum of Azerbaijani History and was elected to the Academic Association of the University of Baku where he chaired the Department of Archeology and Numismatics from 1922 to 1930. He attained to the title of Professor at the Azerbaijani State University in 1945, and chaired the Department of Archaeology there from 1947 to 1953. Pakhomov was granted the title of the Meritorious Scholar of the Azerbaijan SSR in 1955 and elected as a corresponding member of the Azerbaijani Academy of Sciences in 1962.

Pakhomov authored some of the most influential works on the numismatics of Georgia and Azerbaijan. His unique numismatic collections were bequeathed to the museums of Tbilisi, Baku, and Leningrad. Some coins were obtained by the Armenian museum, while others were acquired by private collectors.

Pakhomov is the author of Coins of Georgia, published in 1970.

The articles of Pakhomov are in the process of digitization and upload on the special page on academia.edu.

References 
 A. V. Akopyan. Evgeny Alexandrovich Pakhomov (1880–1965). Bibliography of E. A. Pakhomov’s scientific works // Epigrafika Vostoka. Vol. XXX. Moscow, 2013. P. 310-329. In Russian
 Dictionary. The Russian Coin website. Accessed on December 10, 2007.
Georgian Numismatics Georgian Numismatics

1880 births
1965 deaths
Archaeologists from the Russian Empire
Numismatists from the Russian Empire
Azerbaijani archaeologists
Archaeologists from the Soviet Union
Azerbaijani numismatists
Academic staff of Baku State University
Academic staff of the Azerbaijan State University of Culture and Arts